Peter Lorentzen (born September 2, 1983) is a retired Norwegian professional ice hockey player, who spent most of the career with the Stavanger Oilers in the Norwegian GET-league. He participated at the 2009-, 2010- and 2011 IIHF World Championships as a member of the Norway men's national ice hockey team.

References

External links 
 

1983 births
Norwegian ice hockey forwards
Tri-City Americans players
Rögle BK players
Living people
Stavanger Oilers players
Stjernen Hockey players
IK Comet players
Norwegian expatriate ice hockey people
Norwegian expatriate sportspeople in Sweden
Norwegian expatriate sportspeople in the United States
Sportspeople from Fredrikstad